Gilles de Maistre (born 8 May 1960) is a French filmmaker, journalist, and actor who was nominated for a César Award.

Personal life
He is married to screenwriter Prune de Maistre and has six children. He is a half-brother of Patrice de Maistre and is a grand-nephew of the director René Clément. He is a descendant of the philosopher Joseph de Maistre.

Filmography

References

External links

1960 births
Living people
French film directors
French male screenwriters
French screenwriters
French producers
French cinematographers
French-language film directors
People from Boulogne-Billancourt